Kamal Daneshyar is a member of the Islamic Consultative Assembly in the Islamic Republic of Iran.

Daneshyar has expressed support for private U.S. and European companies to assist Iran in the development of power plants for peaceful use of nuclear energy.

References and notes

External links
Analysis: Iran's nuclear fuel debate

Year of birth missing (living people)
Living people
Members of the 4th Islamic Consultative Assembly
Members of the 5th Islamic Consultative Assembly
Members of the 7th Islamic Consultative Assembly
Development and Justice Party politicians